Florida v. Harris, 568 U.S. 237 (2013), was a case in which the United States Supreme Court addressed the reliability of a dog sniff by a detection dog trained to identify narcotics, under the specific context of whether law enforcement's assertions that the dog is trained or certified is sufficient to establish probable cause for a search of a vehicle under the Fourth Amendment to the United States Constitution.  Harris was the first Supreme Court case to challenge the dog's reliability, backed by data that asserts that on average, up to 80% of a dog's alerts are wrong.  Twenty-four U.S. States, the federal government, and two U.S. territories filed briefs in support of Florida as amici curiae.

Oral argument in this case – and that of another dog sniff case, Florida v. Jardines – was heard on October 31, 2012. The Court unanimously held that if a bona fide organization has certified a dog after testing his reliability in a controlled setting, or if the dog has recently and successfully completed a training program that evaluated his proficiency, a court can presume (subject to any conflicting evidence offered) that the dog's alert provides probable cause to search, using a "totality-of-the-circumstances" approach.

Background
Prior to this case, the United States Supreme Court has on three occasions dealt with cases involving "dog sniffs" by detection dogs trained to identify narcotics, and has addressed whether or not a dog sniff constituted a "search" under the Fourth Amendment.  In those three cases, the Supreme Court has held that:

Indeed, the question of whether or not a canine sniff is a "search" was not at issue in this case.  One passage from Caballes does, however, foretell the issue in the instant case:

This case addressed whether that dog's alert alone is sufficient to establish probable cause for a search, or whether law enforcement must first establish the reliability of such an alert.

Facts of the case
On June 24, 2006, a Liberty County, Florida Sheriff's Canine Officer Wheetley and his drug-detection dog, Aldo, were on patrol. The officer conducted a traffic stop of defendant Clayton Harris's truck because his tag had expired. Approaching the truck, the officer noticed that the defendant was shaking, breathing fast, and appeared agitated – he also noticed an open beer container in the vehicle's cup holder. When the defendant refused consent to search the truck, the officer deployed Aldo to walk around the truck. As he performed a "free air sniff" of the truck's exterior, the dog alerted his handler to the driver's side door handle.

The officer then searched the vehicle, and found over 200 pseudoephedrine pills in a plastic bag under the driver's seat.  On the passenger's side, the officer found boxes containing a total of 8000 matches. Harris was then placed under arrest, and a further search uncovered muriatic acid, antifreeze/water remover, a foam plate inside a latex glove, and a coffee filter with iodine crystals.  The officer testified that these chemicals are precursors of methamphetamine. After being read his Miranda rights, Harris stated that he had been "cooking meth" for about one year, and had most recently cooked it at his home two weeks prior.  As no methamphetamine was found in the vehicle, the State charged Harris with possession of the listed chemical pseudoephedrine with intent to use it to manufacture methamphetamine.

About two months after the June 24 stop, Harris was again stopped by the same officer for another traffic infraction. During that stop, the officer again deployed Aldo – who once again alerted to the driver's side door handle. The officer again searched the vehicle, and found no illegal substances, save for an open bottle of alcoholic beverage.

The trial court denied Harris's motion to suppress the evidence produced by the search, and instead found that there was probable cause to support the search.  The decision of the Florida First District Court of Appeal (DCA), in a per curiam decision, affirmed the trial court's ruling.  The First District, without elaboration, cited State v. Laveroni (2005) and State v. Coleman (2005) as authority in support of affirming the trial court.

Harris sought review by the Supreme Court of Florida, based on contradictory appellate rulings from other districts, namely Gibson v. State (2007) and Matheson v. State (2003).

In his challenge, Harris pointed out that on each of the two occasions in which his vehicle was searched, the dog alerted his handler to contraband which was not present in the vehicle.

Aldo's training and reliability
The police officer testified that on the date of Harris's arrest, he had been on the force for three years, and had been a canine handler for two. Aldo completed a 120-hour drug detection training course two years earlier with his handler at the time, and was certified by an independent company that certifies K-9s.  Aldo is trained and certified to detect cannabis, cocaine, ecstasy, heroin, and methamphetamine – he is not trained to detect alcohol or pseudoephedrine.  Although pseudoephedrine is a precursor to methamphetamine, there was no testimony as to whether a dog trained to detect methamphetamine would also detect pseudoephedrine.

Officer Wheetley and Aldo were partnered for a year before the Harris stop, and they completed an annual forty-hour training seminar four months prior to that stop.  In addition, the officer spends four hours per week training Aldo in detecting drugs in vehicles, buildings, and warehouses. For example, the officer testified, he may take Aldo to a wrecker yard and plant drugs in six to eight out of ten vehicles.  Aldo must alert the handler to the vehicles with drugs, and he is rewarded when he does so.  Aldo's rate of success during these sessions was described as "really good".  The dog's training records, which the officer began keeping six months prior to Harris's stop, showed that on a dual grade of "satisfactory" or "unsatisfactory", Aldo performed "satisfactory" 100% of the time. The officer did not track false positives, nor did he explain whether any false positive alerts by Aldo would affect his "satisfactory" performance rating.

In Florida, a single-purpose dog like Aldo, such as one trained only to detect drugs, is not required by law to carry certification.  In contrast, a dual-purpose dog, such as one trained in both apprehension and drug detection, must carry Florida Department of Law Enforcement (FDLE) certification.

As for Aldo's performance in the field, the Florida Supreme Court noted that:

Lower court
As a result, the Florida Supreme Court reversed, saying:

Additionally, the Florida Supreme Court cited one commentator's description of the "'mythic infallibility' of the dog's nose":

Supreme Court
The State of Florida petitioned the United States Supreme Court for a writ of certiorari, which was granted on March 26, 2012.

Question presented
Harris raises the following issues:

 Whether officers may search a vehicle based solely on an alert by a drug dog.
 What is required to establish that a drug dog is well-trained?

Amicus curiae
Briefs of amicus curiae were filed in support of the petitioner by:
 United States of America
 The States of Alabama, Arizona, Colorado, Delaware, Idaho, Illinois, Indiana, Kansas, Maine, Michigan, Missouri, Nebraska, New Jersey, New Mexico, North Dakota, Oklahoma, Oregon, Pennsylvania, Texas, Utah, Vermont, Virginia, Washington and Wisconsin, plus Puerto Rico and Guam
 National Police Canine Association and Police K-9 Magazine

Briefs of amicus curiae were filed in support of the respondent by:
 National Association of Criminal Defense Lawyers, the American Civil Liberties Union, et al.
 Rutherford Institute
 Electronic Privacy Information Center  (EPIC)
 Fourth Amendment Scholars (34 college law professors)
 Institute for Justice

Arguments

Oral argument was heard on October 31, 2012.  This case was heard on the same day as that of another dog sniff case, Florida v. Jardines.  That case addresses whether a dog sniff at the front door of a house is a Fourth Amendment search requiring probable cause and a search warrant, or whether it is an acceptable minimally invasive warrantless search.

False alerts in the field
In Harris, one of the major points raised by a number of the amici curiae is that a dog's training or certification does not necessarily reflect that dog's reliability in the field.  They point to what they say are "the most comprehensive data available on the rate of false alerts in real-world settings"  – several years' of studies undertaken by an independent government agency in Sydney, Australia, under the Police Powers (Drug Detection Dogs) Act 2001.  Police dogs went through an initial 6 weeks of training to detect cannabis, ecstasy, methamphetamine, cocaine and heroin, received additional training weekly, and were tested and re-certified every three months.  The police dogs would randomly sniff individuals at train stations, licensed premises, on streets and sidewalks, at nightclub strips, shopping centers, concerts, and other public locations – the dog would sit next to a person if it alerted.  In the first 9 months of 2011, dogs alerted (and police searched) 14,102 times, and drugs were found only 2,854 times—a false alert rate of 80%.  Those results, they say, are surprisingly consistent – in 2010, the false alert rate was 74%.  Further still, the study found that individual dog's performance varied wildly, with accuracy rates ranging from a high of 56% to a low of 7%, with two-thirds of the dogs performing below the average. The New South Wales' Ombudsman summarized his report by saying:

Prosecutors, on the other hand, say that does not prove anything.  They point to "residual odors", meaning that the individuals may have in fact been in contact with drugs earlier and the drugs were no longer present, or the drugs may have been extremely well-hidden. In a reply brief, P.J. Bondi, Attorney General of Florida, wrote:

Decision
The United States Supreme Court returned a unanimous decision on February 19, 2013, ruling against Harris and overturning the ruling of the Florida Supreme Court.  In the unanimous opinion, Justice Elena Kagan stated that the dog's certification and continued training are adequate indication of his reliability, and thus is sufficient to presume the dog's alert provides probable cause to search, using the "totality-of-the-circumstances" test per Illinois v. Gates. She wrote that the Florida Supreme Court instead established "a strict evidentiary checklist", where "an alert cannot establish probable cause ... unless the State introduces comprehensive documentation of the dog's prior 'hits' and 'misses' in the field ... No matter how much other proof the State offers of the dog's reliability, the absent field performance records will preclude a finding of probable cause."

The Court did not, however, rule out the questioning of reliability where specific grounds are present. Kagan also stated that "a defendant must have an opportunity to challenge such evidence of a dog's reliability, whether by cross-examining the testifying officer or by introducing his own fact or expert witnesses. The defendant may contest training or testing standards as flawed, or too lax, or raise an issue regarding the particular alert."

See also 
 Detection dog
 Police dog
 Rodriguez v. United States, 
 Florida v. Jardines, 
 Illinois v. Caballes, 
 Katz v. United States, 
 Kyllo v. United States, 
 United States v. Karo, 
 Payton v. New York, 
 Aguilar–Spinelli test
 List of United States Supreme Court cases, volume 568

References

External links 

 U.S. Supreme Court, Docket # 11-817, Proceedings and Orders
 SCOTUSBlog page for Florida v. Harris

United States Supreme Court cases
United States Fourth Amendment case law
Search and seizure case law
United States Supreme Court cases of the Roberts Court
United States privacy case law
United States controlled substances case law
2013 in United States case law
Detection dogs
Liberty County, Florida